Rhamphura is a genus of moths in the family Scythrididae.

Species
 Rhamphura altisierrae (Keifer, 1937)
 Rhamphura ochristriata (Walsingham, 1888)
 Rhamphura perspicillella (Walsingham, 1888)
 Rhamphura suffusa (Walsingham, 1888)

References

Scythrididae
Moth genera